The UK Rock & Metal Albums Chart is a record chart which ranks the best-selling rock and heavy metal albums in the United Kingdom. Compiled and published by the Official Charts Company, the data is based on each album's weekly physical sales, digital downloads and streams. In 2000, there were 18 albums that topped the 52 published charts. The first number-one album of the year was the Guns N' Roses live album Live Era '87–'93, which was released the previous year and topped the chart on 11 December 1999. The album remained at the top of the chart for four weeks, including the first of 2000. The final number-one album of the year was Coldplay's debut studio album Parachutes, which spent the last nine weeks of the year (and the first two weeks of 2001) at number one.

The most successful album on the UK Rock & Metal Albums Chart in 2000 was Parachutes, which spent a total of 21 weeks at number one over three spells, including a run of eleven consecutive weeks and another of nine (eleven including the first two weeks of 2001). Parachutes was the best-selling rock and metal album of the year, ranking 8th in the UK End of Year Albums Chart. As of July 2016, it is the 45th best-selling album in the UK of all-time. Standing on the Shoulder of Giants, the fourth studio album by Oasis, spent nine weeks at number one in 2000; Iron Maiden's Brave New World and Blink-182's Enema of the State were each number one for three weeks; and Dookie by Green Day, Blood Sugar Sex Magik by Red Hot Chili Peppers and Binaural by Pearl Jam spent two weeks at number one.

Chart history

See also
2000 in British music
List of UK Rock & Metal Singles Chart number ones of 2000

References

External links
Official UK Rock & Metal Albums Chart Top 40 at the Official Charts Company
The Official UK Top 40 Rock Albums at BBC Radio 1

2000 in British music
UK Rock and Metal Albums
2000